Tehrik-e-Niswan  (The Women’s Movement) is a women's organization in Pakistan. Tehrik-e-Niswan was formed in 1979  in Karachi, Sindh by Sheema Kermani. Tehrik-e-Niswan was founded in 1979 to use the performing arts as a medium for giving Rights messages to working class women and the marginalized communities. Soon after its formation, in 1980, Zia-ul-Haq’s regime, banned the dance performances, Tehrik used performances as a medium for spreading the message of peace, equality and harmony for women.

Tehrik’s initial focus was on organizing seminars and workshops taking up women issues and now organizes cultural and creative activity like Theatre and Dance to convey its message. Tehrik e Niswan performed many political plays. It performed theatres in  literary events, theatre festivals, conferences, shrines even hospitals. Tehrik organised dance festivals to promote peace in sociaty.

Notable works
 Song of Mohenjodaro
Kirchi Kirchi Karachi
 Manto Mera Dost and Jinnay Lahore Nahi Vekhiya

See also
 Women's Action Forum
 All Pakistan Women's Association
 Blue Veins
 Women's rights

References

External links
 Tehrik-e-Niswan

Women's organisations based in Pakistan
Organizations established in 1979
Women's movements based in Pakistan
Women's rights in Pakistan
Feminism in Pakistan
Feminist organisations in Pakistan
Women in Pakistan
Feminist movements and ideologies